Sumo Salad is an Australian salad bar founded in 2003 in Liverpool Street, Sydney by Luke Baylis and James Miller.

Initially, Baylis and Miller hired friends and family to develop the business, including a trainer and marketer. In its first decade, Sumo Salad grew through franchising to have 100 stores, it also managed to expand internationally, having the total of 9 stores in New Zealand, Singapore, the United Arab Emirates and Brazil.

From 2013 to 2015, Sumo Salad partnered with Paleo diet advocate Pete Evans.

See also
 List of restaurant chains in Australia

References

External links

Fast-food franchises
Fast-food chains of Australia
Australian companies established in 2003
Restaurants established in 2003
2003 establishments in Australia
Privately held companies of Australia